Ronald T. "Ron" Coder (born September 14, 1928) is a former American soccer goalkeeper who was a member of the U.S. team at the 1956 Summer Olympics.

Coder grew up in Montgomery County, Pennsylvania where he was a state champion high school track star.  He entered Penn State University in 1947.  Bill Jeffrey spotted Coder playing an intramural soccer game during Coder's sophomore year and recruited him into the school's soccer team.  Coder and his teammates went on to win the 1950 and 1951 college championships.

Coder graduated in the spring of 1951, was commissioned as a second lieutenant in the United States Air Force and became a tanker pilot. In 1955, he joined the Armed Forces soccer team.  As a result, he attended trials for the 1956 U.S. Olympic soccer team and was selected as the team's starting goalkeeper.  Prior to the tournament in Melbourne, Australia, the U.S. toured the Far East.  In a game in Hong Kong, Coder broke his ankle when kicked by an opposing team's forward and he did not play in the lone U.S. game, a 9–1 loss to Yugoslavia. Coder continued to serve in the Air Force, retiring as a lieutenant colonel.  His son, Ron Coder later played football at Penn State and with the Seattle Seahawks.

See also
List of Pennsylvania State University Olympians

References

1928 births
Living people
American soccer players
Olympic soccer players of the United States
Footballers at the 1956 Summer Olympics
Penn State Nittany Lions men's soccer players
American aviators
United States Air Force officers
Soccer players from Pennsylvania
Association football goalkeepers